The 2012 Norwegian Figure Skating Championships were held at the Leangen Arena in Trondheim from January 13 to 15, 2012. Skaters competed in the discipline of single skating. The results were used to choose the teams to the 2012 World Championships, the 2012 European Championships, the 2012 Nordic Championships, and the 2012 World Junior Championships.

Senior results

Ladies

External links
 2012 Norwegian Championships results
 info at the Norges Skøyteforbund

Norwegian Figure Skating Championships
Norwegian Figure Skating Championships, 2012
2012 in Norwegian sport